Turgenevsky (masculine), Turgenevskaya (feminine), or Turgenevskoye (neuter) is the name of several rural localities in Russia:
Turgenevsky, Oryol Oblast, a settlement in Koshelevsky Selsoviet of Sverdlovsky District in Oryol Oblast; 
Turgenevsky, Saratov Oblast, a settlement in Pugachyovsky District of Saratov Oblast
Turgenevsky, Tula Oblast, a settlement in Velminskaya Rural Administration of Uzlovsky District in Tula Oblast